Nisyros also spelled Nisiros is a volcanic Greek island and municipality located in the Aegean Sea. It is part of the Dodecanese group of islands, situated between the islands of Kos and Tilos.
 
Several other islets are found in the direct vicinity of Nisyros, the largest of which is Gyali, with a population of 22 citizens. The Municipality of Nisyros includes Gyalí, as well as uninhabited Pacheiá, Pergoússa, Kandelioussa, Ágios Antónios and Stroggýli. The island was also called Nisiro in Italian and İncirli in Turkish.

Geology 

Its coasts are generally rocky or pebbled, but there are also a few sandy beaches (mainly in the northeastern part). The volcano is currently active but not erupting, and fumaroles are found at the craters. It has had four historical eruptions, all of which had a VEI of 2. Almost all of its eruptions involved phreatic activity. The latest eruptive activity was a steam explosion in 1888, after small ash eruptions in 1871 and 1873, and earthquakes are not infrequent. A period of seismic unrest in 1996–1997 led an international team of scientists to initiate monitoring of the volcanic unrest, as part of the European Union sponsored Geowarn project. The entire volcanic complex includes the seafloor between Nisyros and Kos, the island of Gyali and a part of Kos island.

Geography 

Nisyros can experience the Meltemi Etesian wind through June - August. This is most obvious on the eastern and western flanks of the volcano, where trees are bent towards the south from the force of the winds. The wind may be especially strong on the island due to jet effects as it passes over Kos.

Settlements 

The island is reachable by ship from Piraeus, Rhodes and Kos, and in summer, there are many daily trips from the village of Kardamena on Kos. There is also a heliport. The main town and port of the island is Mandraki (pop. 660). Other villages are Paloi (239), Nikia (61), and Emporeios (27). According to the 2011 census, the municipality's resident population is 1,008 (including 21 on Gyali), although in summer it is augmented by many tourists as well as expatriate Nisyrians who visit the island for their vacations. Tourism is not so heavily developed as on other Greek islands. Deposits of perlite and pumice on Gyali provide much of the wealth of the island. The island used to be self-sufficient, and many crops were grown on its terraced slopes. Today, though, they are cultivated on a smaller scale.

History 

According to Greek mythology, the island was formed when Poseidon cut off a part of Kos and threw it onto the giant Polybotes to stop him from escaping. The ancient name of the Nisyros was Porphyris. Ancient walls, dating from the 5th century BC, part of the acropolis of the island, are found near Mandraki.

It was apparently also a source of millstones used in some of the earliest watermills, being referred to by epigrammatist Antipater of Thessalonica in the 1st century BC.

The island is mentioned by Homer in the Iliad.

In Roman times it became part of the Insulae province.

Between X-XI centuries, Genoese captains and adventurers who had a private fleet organized in clans united by family ties, exercised sovereignty and maritime control on behalf of the Byzantines, and these clans in exchange for the protection of the seas were given a concession to exploit raw materials, rights of trade and collection of customs duties.

The Knights Hospitaller in 1315  were allowed to settle on the island upon payment of rent to Genoese government ruled by the Vignolo family,  and they built the crusader castle.

In the following centuries there were clashes with Saracens and Venetians crusaders, and with uncertain outcomes the island passed to Ottomans in 1566; then passed almost 4 centuries later from the Ottomans to the Italians in 1911 during the Italo-Turkish War, along with the rest of the Dodecanese islands. It finally was annexed to the Greek Kingdom after the Second World War, in 1947.

Christianity 
The patron saint of the island is Saint Nikitas. Many Orthodox Christian churches are found on the island, as well as four monasteries which are not inhabited by monks today, although various celebrations take place in them. The largest monastery is the one of Panagia Spiliani (Blessed Virgin Mary of the cave) at Mandraki. It is built beside the medieval castle erected by the Knights Hospitaller.

Diocese of Nisyrus
Nisyrus was a suffragan of Rhodes, but the bishopric faded. Known bishops included Matthaeus de Cheselles (appointed 1436), Pierre Fridaricus (served from the 1480s), Pedro Xague (appointed 1560), and Jerónimo Clavijo (appointed 1564).

Latin titular see 
The diocese was nominally restored in 1927 as Titular See of the lowest (Episcopal) rank, initially named Nysirus (Curiate Italian Nisiro), and renamed Nisyrus in 1928.

It has been vacant for decades, having had the following incumbents:
 Francesco Fellinger (26 February 1929 – 22 July 1940)
 Augusto Osvaldo Salinas Fuenzalida, Picpus Fathers (SS.CC.) (9 February 1941 – 3 August 1950)
 Elizeu Simões Mendes (21 August 1950 – 19 September 1953)
 Carlos Maria Jurgens Byrne, Redemptorists (C.SS.R.) (7 February 1954 – 17 December 1956) (later Archbishop)
 Augusto Trujillo Arango (25 April 1957 – 31 March 1960) (later Archbishop)
 Auguste Joseph Gaudel (1 September 1960 – 8 August 1969)

Culture 
A traditional product of Nisyros is soumada, a non-alcoholic almond-flavoured drink.

Twinning 
Mandraki is twinned with the following municipalities:
  Lapithos, Cyprus

Notable natives and residents 
 John Catsimatidis, New York City owner of Gristedes

See also 
 List of volcanoes in Greece
 List of traditional Greek place names

References

External links 

 Official website 
 Volcano World: Nisyros, Greece 
 Photoblog from bRandSboRg.CoM

Islands of Greece
Dodecanese
Municipalities of the South Aegean
Volcanoes of Greece
Volcanoes of the Aegean
Active volcanoes
Pleistocene stratovolcanoes
Holocene stratovolcanoes
Calderas
VEI-2 volcanoes
Populated places in Kos (regional unit)
Landforms of Kos (regional unit)
Islands of the South Aegean
Members of the Delian League
Greek city-states
Locations in the Iliad
Populated places in the ancient Aegean islands
Catholic titular sees in Europe